Tours Football Club, commonly referred to as simply Tours, is a French association football club based in Tours, the capital city of the Indre-et-Loire department. The club was formed in 1919 and currently play at the fifth level of French football. Tours plays its home matches at the Stade de la Vallée du Cher located within the city.

History
Tours Football Club was founded in 1919 as under the name AS Docks-du-Centre. After two years of playing under the moniker, the club changed its name to AS du Centre. The club spent 30 years under the name as French football entered professionalism in the 1930s. In 1951, the club changed its name again to the current Tours FC. Under the Tours emblem, the club achieved success in its infancy reaching the Round of 64 in the Coupe de France thanks to player-coach Alfred Aston that same year.

Tours was promoted to the first division in 1980. Prior to the start of the season, the club signed prolific striker Delio Onnis from Monaco. Onnis improved the club's attack significantly over the next three years and departing the club in 1983 after Tours suffered relegation. During Onnis' stint between 1980 and 1983, Tours twice reached the semi-finals of the Coupe de France in 1982 and 1983. The club was eliminated on both occasions by Paris Saint-Germain. In 1984, Tours quickly returned to the first division after winning Division 2 title. However, after one season, the club returned to the lower league. Tours have yet to manage a return to Ligue 1.

During the club's current absence from Ligue 1, Tours fell to the Championnat National, the third division of French football, after finishing dead last in the 2006–07 season. During the season, Albert Falette, the club manager for eight years was removed from his position. At the end of the season, the club released or sold almost all its players, including captain David Fleurival. The club only kept long-time goalkeeper Armand Raimbault and young prospect Rudy Wendling. The long-term outlook strategy paid off with the club finishing second in the 2007–08 National season, thus returning to Ligue 2, where the club remained for ten years until relegated to Championnat National following a last place finish in the 2017-2018 campaign.

The club were relegated again at the end of the 2018–19 Championnat National season, and were further relegated administratively by the DNCG, confirmed by appeal on 11 July 2019, forcing them to play at the fifth level Championnat National 3 in the 2019–20 season.

In April 2020, after the truncation of the season due to the COVID-19 pandemic, Tours expected to be promoted back to Championnat National 2, due to being placed top of their group at the time the season was stopped. However, on 15 June 2020, The DNCG committee of the FFF denied their promotion. The decision was ratified by the appeal committee on 10 July 2020.

In March 2021, after a season voided by COVID-19, the club announced the opening of a Société coopérative d’intérêt collectif (SCIC) (cooperative shareholding society) with the hope of involving more of the community in the governance of the club. In July 2021, the DNCG committee of the FFF relegated the club to the sixth tier for financial reasons. The result was confirmed on appeal later in the month. They finished top of their division at the end of the 2021–22 season, but the league ruled they were to be denied promotion for financial reasons. The decision was overturned on appeal, and Tours climbed back to National 3.

Colours and logos

Tours' crest is inspired by the city's coats of arms with three towers and a Fleur-de-lis. It bears the club's motto "Turonorum civitas libera", which means in Latin "Free city of Turones". Turones is the Celtic tribe, which gave its name to Tours. The motto was found engraved on a rock, which is now in the undergrounds of the Beaux Arts Museum located in the city. The salamander is a reference to King François I.

Stadium
Tours has been playing at the Stade de la Vallée du Cher since 1978. In 1979, the stadium's capacity was 22,000, but now only incorporates on 13,500. The stadium was built thanks to former mayor Jean Royer, as he wanted a decent venue for the club. Before the construction of the Vallée du Cher, Tours played its home matches at the Stade de Grammont.

Supporters
In France, Tours is not a town fond of football because of the lack of football tradition. Moreover, supporters were disappointed of the club's poor results in the past. However, the accession to Ligue 2 in 2006 where they remained for 10 seasons created some interest in the city and audiences in the stadium are gradually increasing. There are currently three groups of supporters:

 Amicale des supporters
 Turons 1951
 Les Diables Bleus

Players

Current squad

Reserve team

Notable former players
Below are the notable former players who have represented Tours in league and international competition since the club's foundation in 1919. To appear in the section below, a player must have played in at least 80 official matches for the club.

For a complete list of Tours FC players, see :Category:Tours FC players.

 Alfred Aston
 Fatih Atık
 Patrice Augustin
 Yves Bertucci
 Julien Cétout
 Olivier Giroud
 Sébastien Gondouin
 Christophe Himmer
 Laurent Koscielny
 Frédéric Laurent
 Guy Lacombe
 Christophe Mandanne
 Michel Rodriguez
 Youssouf Touré
 Omar da Fonseca
 Delio Onnis
 Gaëtan Englebert
 Jean-Marc Adjovi-Bocco
 Cédric Collet
 David Fleurival
 Peter Jehle
 Antoine Dossevi

Managers

References

External links
  

 
Association football clubs established in 1951
Sport in Tours, France
1951 establishments in France
Football clubs in France
Football clubs in Centre-Val de Loire
Ligue 1 clubs